According to the Lithuanian census of 2021, the predominant religion in Lithuania is Christianity, with the largest confession being that of the Catholic Church (about 74% of the population). There are smaller groups of Orthodox Christians, Evangelical Lutherans, members of Reformed churches, other Protestants, Jews and Muslims as well as people of other religions.

According to the 2010 Eurobarometer Poll, 47% of Lithuanian citizens responded that "they believe there is a God", 37% answered that "they believe there is some sort of spirit or life force", and 12% said that "they do not believe there is any sort of spirit, god, or life force".

History 
The first census in independent Lithuania, in 1923, established the following religious distribution: Catholic — 85.7 per cent; Jews — 7.7 per cent; Protestant — 3.8 per cent; Greek Orthodox — 2.7 per cent.

Population by religious confession 

According to the 2021 census:
 Catholic – 74.19% (2,085,340)
 Orthodox – 3.75% (105,326)
 Orthodox Old Believers – 0.65% (18,196)
 Evangelical Lutherans – 0.56% (15,741)
 Evangelical Reformed – 0.2% (5,540)
 Sunni Muslim - 0.08 (2,165)
 Baptists and free churchpersons - 0.04% (1,092)
 Judaic – 0.03% (899)
 Greek Catholics (Uniates) – 0.03% (785)
 Karaites – 0.01% (255)
 Other religions – 0.58% (16,486)
 No religion – 6.11% (171,810)
 Did not specify – 13.67% (384,094)

Christianity

Catholic Church

According to the 2021 census, 74% of Lithuanians belonged to the Catholic Church, which has claimed the adherence of the majority of Lithuanians since the Christianization of Lithuania in the 14th and 15th centuries. Lithuania kept its Catholic identity under the Russian Empire and later under the Soviet Union when some Catholic priests led the resistance against the Communist regime, which is commemorated in the Hill of Crosses near Šiauliai, a shrine to the anti-communist resistance.

Greek Catholics
The center of Greek Catholic life in Lithuania is the Basilian Monastery and Church of the Holy Trinity in Vilnius. In the past, the monastery was multiethnic but now serves a mostly Ukrainian community.

Protestantism
Protestants are 0.8%, of which 0.6% are Lutheran and 0.2% are Reformed. According to Losch (1932), the Lutherans were 3.3% of the total population; they were mainly Germans in the Memel territory (now Klaipėda). There was also a tiny Reformed community (0.5% which still persists. Protestantism has declined with the removal of the German and Prussian Lithuanian populations, and today it is mainly represented by ethnic Lithuanians throughout the northern and western parts of the country, as well as large urban areas. Believers and clergy suffered greatly during the Soviet occupation, with many killed, tortured or deported to Siberia. Newly arriving evangelical churches have established missions in Lithuania since 1990.

Lutheranism

Protestants make up 0.8% of the population, with 0.56% belonging to the Evangelical Lutheran Church of Lithuania.

Lutheranism in Lithuania dates back to the 16th century, when it came mainly from the neighbouring German-controlled areas of Livonia and East Prussia. A Synod in Vilnius united the church in 1557. The parish network covered nearly all of the Grand Duchy, with district centers in Vilnius, Kedainai, Biržai, Slucke, Kojdanove and Zabludove later Izabeline. Small Protestant communities are dispersed throughout the northern and western parts of the country.

The majority of Prussian Lithuanians living in East Prussia and in Memelland (since 1945 the Klaipėda Region of Lithuania) belonged to the Evangelical Church of the old-Prussian Union. Most resettled in the West Germany after World War II along with the ethnic German inhabitants.

Since 1945, Lutheranism in Lithuania has declined largely due to the ongoing secularization that sweeps throughout Europe.

Calvinism
The Lithuanian Evangelical Reformed Church is a historic denomination which was founded in 1557. A notable member was Szymon Zajcusz. In the second half of the 16th century the Unitarians separated. The denomination has over 7,000 members in 14 congregations. The church is a member of the World Communion of Reformed Churches and the World Reformed Fellowship

Other Protestants
Various Protestant churches have established missions in Lithuania since 1990, including the United Methodists, the Baptist Union, the Mennonites, and World Venture.

Eastern Orthodoxy 

Eastern Orthodoxy claims 4.1% of the population, mainly from the Russian minority.  Orthodox Christianity is the first form of Christianity to arrive in Lithuania, with the marriage of Algirdas to Maria of Vitebsk and the martyrdom of Ss. Anthony, John, and Eustathius of Vilnius.  The church founded by Maria of Vitebsk, St. Paraskevi Church, is the oldest continuously existing Christian congregation in the country and one of only two Orthodox churches in Lithuania fully worshiping in the Lithuanian language.

Oriental Orthodoxy / Armenian Apostolic Church 
Most of the Armenians in Lithuania, making up about 0.1% of population according to its own estimates, belong to the Armenian Apostolic Church, which is often classified as an Oriental Orthodox Church, in distinction from Eastern Orthodox (to which the main Russian, Greek and Georgian Churches belong).

An Armenian Apostolic Church dedicated to St. Vardan was opened in Vilnius in 2006.

Islam

In Lithuania, Islam has a long history unlike in many other northern European countries. The medieval Grand Duchy of Lithuania of the Polish–Lithuanian Commonwealth allowed Muslims, notably the Crimean Tatars to settle in the lands in the south. Some of people from those lands were moved into ethnically Lithuanian lands, now the current Republic of Lithuania, mainly under the rule of Grand Duke Vytautas. The Tatars, now referred to as Lithuanian Tatars, lost their language over time and now speak Lithuanian as natives; however, they have strongly maintained their Muslim faith.

Judaism

The Lithuanian Jewish community has roots that go back to before the time of the Grand Duchy of Lithuania. Lithuania was historically home to a large Jewish community and an important center of Jewish scholarship and culture from the 18th century until the community was almost entirely eliminated during the Holocaust. Before World War II, the Lithuanian Jewish population numbered some 160,000, about 7% of the total population. Vilnius alone had a Jewish community of nearly 100,000, about 45% of the city's total population with over 110 synagogues and 10 yeshivot in the city.

There are communities of Jews of Lithuanian descent around the world, especially in Israel, the United States, South Africa, Zimbabwe, Brazil and Australia.

According to the 2001 census, there were 1,272 adherents of Rabbinic and Karaite Judaism. About 4,000 Jews were counted in Lithuania during the 2005 census.

Karaites
 
According to a Karaite tradition, several hundred Crimean Karaites were invited to Lithuania by Grand Duke Vytautas to settle in Trakai ca. 1397. A small community remains in Trakai, which has preserved the Turkic Karaim language and distinctive customs, such as its traditional dish called "kibinai", a sort of meat pastry, and its houses with three windows, one for God, one for the family and one for Grand Duke Vytautas.

Romuva

Medieval Lithuania was the last pagan nation in Europe, officially converting in the late 14th century. The neo-pagan movement Romuva, established in 1967, attempts to reconstruct and revive Lithuanian ethnic religion.

See also
 Hinduism in Lithuania

References